Winchester College appears in fiction both as a school and as fictional Old Wykehamists, people who had been to the school. At least 50 fictional Old Wykehamists have appeared in novels, sometimes following the stereotype of the dull civil servant, though in fact relatively few real Wykehamists choose that profession. The school is further represented indirectly by the writings of Old Wykehamists on other topics.

The school in fiction

Poetry 

Amy Audrey Locke's 1912 In Praise of Winchester offers an anthology of over 100 pages of prose and verse about Winchester College. The poets represented in the book include the Old Wykehamists John Crommelin-Brown, Lord Alfred Douglas, Robert Ensor, A. P. Herbert, George Huddesford, Lionel Johnson, William Lipscomb, Robert Seton-Watson, Thomas Adolphus Trollope, Thomas Warton, and William Whitehead. Others in the collection include the biographer and suffragist Laura Ridding, wife of one of the school's headmasters, George Ridding.

Huddesford edited an anthology of poetry by fellow Old Wykehamists called Wiccamical Chaplet, dedicated to the finance minister Henry Addington. Some of the poems are in Latin, including the school song, "Domum", subtitled by Huddesford "" ("The Winchester College Song"). One of the poems, "On a Threat to Destroy the Tree at Winchester", alludes to "", as indicated in its subtitle, "Round which [tree] the Scholars, on Breaking up [at end of term], sing their celebrated Song, called ''." Locke provides a verse translation along with the Latin version, and "A Domum Legend" which gives an alternative version of how the school song came into existence.

Prose 

A former headmaster of Winchester College, James Sabben-Clare, comments that the school itself has been "largely spared the full fictional treatment". E. H. Lacon-Watson's 1935 book In the Days of His Youth however portrays the school in the 19th century under the headmastership of George Ridding, "thinly disguised as Dr. Spedding".

Old Wykehamists in fiction 

Sabben-Clare discusses how Wykehamists appear in fiction. He notes that James Bond's chaperon, Captain Paul Sender is just one of at least 50 Old Wykehamists in fiction, a dull civil servant, "overcrammed and underloved at Winchester". Sabben-Clare states that despite the stereotype of Wykehamists becoming Civil Servants, between 1820 and 1922 only around 7% of Wykehamists went into the Civil Service, and by 1981 the number had fallen to about 2%. On the other hand, Sabben-Clare writes, Wykehamists have always been drawn to law, with about ten entrants to the profession each year. He find it surprising that so few Wykehamist lawyers are found in fiction: he mentions Monsarrat's John Morell and Charles Morgan's Gaskony.

References

Sources 

 
 
 

Winchester College